Michael Mitnick (born September 7, 1983) is an American playwright and screenwriter.

Early life
Mitnick grew up in Pittsburgh, Pennsylvania and attended Fox Chapel Area High School, a public school in the Allegheny Valley. His father is a professor and the co-originator of The Theory of Agency. His mother is a public librarian. As a high school student, he worked in the graphic design department of WQED Pittsburgh and Mister Rogers' Neighborhood. Mitnick attended Harvard University, where he wrote or co-wrote four musical comedies, including one Hasty Pudding Theatricals show. His musical Snapshots had two off-Broadway performances in New York. He was a member of the A capella group The Krokodiloes. After graduating in 2006, Mitnick worked at The Atlantic Monthly before earning his Master of Fine Arts degree in playwriting from The Yale School of Drama.

Career

Plays

Film

Television

Music
Mitnick co-wrote the holiday song "Christmas You Go So Fast," which was featured onVinyl, an HBO series executive produced by Martin Scorsese and Mick Jagger.

He also co-wrote, with Will Connolly and Kim Rosenstock, the musical, Fly By Night, which released a cast recording for its Off-Broadway run.

Honors
Variety magazine selected Mitnick as one of "10 Screenwriters to watch" in 2013. He received the 2012 Visionary Playwright Award from Theater Masters. He is a two-time winner of the Edgerton New American Foundation Award, for The Siegel (2017) and Fly By Night (2011), the latter of which was also nominated for four 2015 Drama Desk Awards including Best Musical.

Works in development
In May 2017, Deadline placed Mitnick's original screenplay Some Are Born Great on its 2017 Cannes Hotlist, and he was slated to direct the film.

In May 2019, it was announced that Mitnick is working on a stage musical adaptation of the film Scotland, PA, set to premiere at Roundabout Theatre Company.

Mitnick is reported to be writing the screenplay for a forthcoming Audrey Hepburn biopic. He is also currently working on a limited series about Siegfried & Roy, adapting the Judy Batalion novel Light of Days, and adapting the anthology series Dial M for Murder for MGM.

References

1983 births
Living people
21st-century American dramatists and playwrights
Harvard University alumni
Yale School of Drama alumni